Fair Week is a 1924 American silent comedy film directed by Rob Wagner and written by Thomas J. Geraghty and Walter Woods. The film stars Walter Hiers, Constance Wilson, Carmen Phillips, J. Farrell MacDonald, Bobbie Mack, and Mary Jane Irving. The film was released on March 16, 1924, by Paramount Pictures.

Plot
As described in a film magazine review, Slim Swasey of Rome, Missouri, is the guardian of Tinkle, a six year old girl deserted by some member of a traveling show. During Fair Week balloonist Madame Le Grande arrives. Isadore Kelly and 'Sure Thing' Sherman are crooks and plan to rob the town bank. When the balloon ascends in a sudden flight, Tinkle is its only passenger, but Slim rushes to the rescue with some acrobatic stunts. Later, Slim foils the scheme of the crooks and wins the affections of Ollie Remus, the young woman that he loves. Madame Le Grande turns out to be Tinkle's mother.

Cast
Walter Hiers as Slim Swasey
Constance Wilson as Ollie Remus
Carmen Phillips as	Madame Le Grande
J. Farrell MacDonald as Jasper Remus
Bobbie Mack as Dan Hogue
Mary Jane Irving as Tinkle
Earl Metcalfe as 'Sure Thing' Sherman
Knute Erickson as Isadore Kelly
Jane Keckley as Mary Ellen Allen

Constance Wilson was the sister of actress Lois Wilson.

Preservation
A print of Fair Week survives in the Gosfilmofond archive.

References

External links

1924 films
1920s English-language films
Silent American comedy films
1924 comedy films
Paramount Pictures films
American black-and-white films
American silent feature films
1920s American films